Manuel Valoi (born 6 August 1968) is a Mozambican footballer. He played in one match for the Mozambique national football team in 1995. He was also named in Mozambique's squad for the 1996 African Cup of Nations tournament.

References

1968 births
Living people
Mozambican footballers
Mozambique international footballers
1996 African Cup of Nations players
Place of birth missing (living people)
Association footballers not categorized by position